"You Will Know" is a song written and recorded by American R&B singer-songwriter Stevie Wonder, taken from his 1987 Characters album. It is the opening track on the album, and is the second single from the album as well. This is Stevie Wonder's 20th and final  number-one R&B hit single. Wonder performed the song along with R&B quartet Jodeci and Mary J. Blige on an episode of The Arsenio Hall Show in late 1992.

Chart performance
In March 1988, the song reached number 77 on the US Billboard Hot 100, number 1 on the R&B chart, "You Will Know" also peaked at number 16 on the Adult Contemporary charts.

Critical reception
Karen Swayne from Number One wrote, "This isn't one of the best tracks, but there's a warmt and humanity to it that mean all".

Charts

References

Stevie Wonder songs
1987 songs
1987 singles
Songs written by Stevie Wonder
Motown singles
Song recordings produced by Stevie Wonder